Rudolph Cruzette Redmond (born August 25, 1947, in Spokane, Washington) is a former American football cornerback in the National Football League. He was drafted by the Chicago Bears in the fourth round of the 1969 NFL Draft. He played college football at Pacific.

Redmond also played for the Atlanta Falcons and Detroit Lions.

1947 births
Living people
Players of American football from Spokane, Washington
American football cornerbacks
Pacific Tigers football players
Chicago Bears players
Atlanta Falcons players
Detroit Lions players